WJOP-LP (96.3 FM), known as Joppa Radio, is a low power FM radio station in Newburyport, Massachusetts, licensed to the Newburyport Community Media Center.  With studios located in the Commerce Park building (as part of their community television facilities known as PortMedia) and antenna atop of Newburyport High School, Joppa Radio officially began broadcasting on April 16, 2016, initially with an all classical format, but intending to diversify as its listener donated library grows.

External links
 

JOP-LP
JOP-LP
Radio stations established in 2016
2016 establishments in Massachusetts
Newburyport, Massachusetts
Mass media in Essex County, Massachusetts

Community radio stations in the United States